Komsomolets is the name of several rural localities in Russia.

Modern localities
Komsomolets, Altai Krai, a settlement in Nalobikhinsky Selsoviet of Kosikhinsky District in Altai Krai; 
Komsomolets, Krasnodar Krai, a settlement in Krasnoarmeysky Rural Okrug of Yeysky District in Krasnodar Krai; 
Komsomolets, Orenburg Oblast, a settlement in Toksky Selsoviet of Krasnogvardeysky District in Orenburg Oblast
Komsomolets, Stavropol Krai, a settlement in Komsomolsky Selsoviet of Kirovsky District in Stavropol Krai
Komsomolets, Republic of Tatarstan, a settlement in Tukayevsky District of the Republic of Tatarstan
Komsomolets, Udmurt Republic, a village in Komsomolsky Selsoviet of Igrinsky District in the Udmurt Republic
Komsomolets, Volgograd Oblast, a selo in Komsomolsky Selsoviet of Nikolayevsky District in Volgograd Oblast
Komsomolets, Voronezh Oblast, a settlement in Butyrskoye Rural Settlement of Repyovsky District in Voronezh Oblast

Alternative names
Komsomolets, alternative name of Komsomolsky, a settlement in Shishinskaya Rural Territory of Topkinsky District in Kemerovo Oblast; 
Komsomolets, alternative name of Komsomolskoye, a selo in Kizilyurtovsky District of the Republic of Dagestan;

See also
Komsomolsk, Russia
Komsomolsky, Russia